Tannodia swynnertonii is a species of plant in the family Euphorbiaceae. It is found in Mozambique, Tanzania, and Zimbabwe.

References

Aleuritideae
Vulnerable plants
Flora of Africa
Taxonomy articles created by Polbot